Sir Clive Buckland Lewis (born 13 June 1960), styled The Rt Hon. Lord Justice Lewis, is a judge of the Court of Appeal of England and Wales, one of the Senior Courts of England and Wales.

He was educated at Cwmtawe Community School, Churchill College, Cambridge (BA, 1981) and Dalhousie University (LLM, 1983).

Lewis was a lecturer at the University of East Anglia and at University of Cambridge, where he was a fellow of Selwyn College,  before being called to the bar at Middle Temple in 1987. He was appointed a Recorder in 2003 and was approved to sit as a deputy High Court judge. In 2003, he became a Queen's Counsel. On 13 June 2013, he was appointed a High Court judge, receiving the customary knighthood in the 2014 Special Honours, and assigned to the Queen's Bench Division.

He was appointed a Lord Justice of Appeal in October 2020.

He is a member of the Athenaeum Club and the Royal Automobile Club.

References

1960 births
Living people
Alumni of Churchill College, Cambridge
Dalhousie University alumni
Academics of the University of East Anglia
Academics of the University of Cambridge
21st-century English judges
Lords Justices of Appeal
Members of the Privy Council of the United Kingdom
Queen's Bench Division judges
Knights Bachelor